Sergey Mikhailovich Grigoriants (born 2 November 1983) is a Russian chess player, who was awarded the title of Grandmaster in 2003.

Chess career 
Grigoriants won the U14 section of the World Youth Championships in 1997 and the U16 section of the European Youth Championships in 1999. In 2004, he shared first place with Evgeny Najer, Kaido Külaots, Artyom Timofeev, Zoltan Gyimesi and Oleg Korneev in the Cappelle-la-Grande Open tournament. The following year, Grigoriants attained the title of Moscow Champion. 

In 2006 he scored 7 points out of 10 games, a half point less than the winner, at the 22nd Open tournament in Cappelle-la-Grande.

In 2018 he married the Hungarian chess player Petra Papp.

References

External links 
 
 
 Sergey Grigoriants games at 365Chess.com

1983 births
Living people
Chess grandmasters
Russian chess players
Sportspeople from Tashkent
World Youth Chess Champions